In computer science, a predictive state representation (PSR) is a way to model a state of controlled dynamical system from a history of actions taken and resulting observations. PSR captures the state of a system as a vector of predictions for future tests (experiments) that can be done on the system. A test is a sequence of action-observation pairs and its prediction is the probability of the test's observation-sequence happening if the test's action-sequence were to be executed on the system. One of the advantage of using PSR is that the predictions are directly related to observable quantities.  This is in contrast to other models of dynamical systems, such as partially observable Markov decision processes (POMDPs) where the state of the system is represented as a probability distribution over unobserved nominal states.

References

 

 

 

Machine learning
Dynamical systems